The Women's Tennis Association (WTA) is the principal organizing body of women's professional tennis. It governs the WTA Tour which is the worldwide professional tennis tour for women and was founded to create a better future for women's tennis. The WTA's corporate headquarters is in St. Petersburg, Florida, with its European headquarters in London and its Asia-Pacific headquarters in Beijing.

The Women's Tennis Association was founded in June 1973 by Billie Jean King, and traces its origins to the inaugural Virginia Slims tournament, arranged by Gladys Heldman, sponsored by Joe Cullman, CEO of Philip Morris, and held on 23 September 1970 at the Houston Racquet Club in Houston, Texas. Rosie Casals won this first event.

When the Women's Tennis Association was founded, Billie Jean King was one of nine players that comprised the WTA, also referred to as the Original 9, that included Julie Heldman, Valerie Ziegenfuss, Judy Dalton, Kristy Pigeon, Peaches Bartkowicz, Kerry Melville Reid, Nancy Richey, and Rosie Casals.  Today, the WTA has more than 2,500 players from nearly 100 countries competing for $146 million in prize money.

In December 2021, following Peng Shuai's endangerment by the Chinese government, the WTA suspended its operations in China and Hong Kong.

Early history
Tennis's Open Era, in which professional players were allowed to compete alongside amateurs, began in 1968. Billie Jean King was a high ranking tennis player in the late 1960s who won several titles and was interviewed in the media. The first Open Tournament was the British Hard Court Championships in Bournemouth. Later that year at the first Open Wimbledon, the prize fund difference was 2.5:1 in favor of men. King won £750 for taking the title, while Rod Laver won £2,000. The total purses of both competitions were £14,800 for men and £5,680 for women. Confusion also reigned as no one knew how many Open Tournaments there were supposed to be. The tournaments that did not want to provide prize money eventually faded out of the calendar, including the US Eastern Grass Court circuit with stops at Merion Cricket Club and Essex county club.

There were two professional tennis circuits in existence at the start of the Open Era: World Championship Tennis (WCT), which was for men only, and the National Tennis League (NTL). Ann Jones, Rosie Casals, Françoise Dürr, and Billie Jean King joined NTL. King was paid $40,000 a year, Jones was paid $25,000, and Casals and Durr were paid $20,000 each. The group played established tournaments, such as the US Open and Wimbledon. But the group also organised their own tournaments, playing in the South of France for two months. The International Tennis Federation (ITF) then imposed several sanctions on the group: the women were not allowed to play in the Wightman Cup in 1968 and 1969 and the USLTA refused to include Casals and King in their rankings for those years.

By the 1970s the pay differential had increased. King said "Promoters were making more money than women. Male tennis players were making more money. Everybody was making more money except the women". In 1969, ratios of 5:1 in terms of pay between men and women were common at smaller tournaments. By 1970 these figures had increased to up to 12:1.

Billie Jean King and Cynthia Starr wrote in their book, We Have Come a Long Way, in 1988, "The women were being squeezed financially because we had no control in a male-dominated sport. Men owned, ran and promoted the tournaments, and because many of them were former players themselves, their sympathies lay with the male players, who argued vociferously that most of the money should be theirs." The low point in women's pay inequality came before the US Open in 1970. The Pacific Southwest Championships directed by Jack Kramer, had announced a 12:1 ratio in the prize money difference between what males and females would win. This tournament provoked the top 9 woman tennis players to take a stand for equality. "These woman became known as the Original 9". They did not play in the Los Angeles tournament and instead wanted to create their own tennis tournament.

Several female players contacted Gladys Heldman, publisher of World Tennis Magazine, and stated that they wanted to boycott the event. Although Heldman advised against it, she did help them put together their own tournament in Houston which would not take place until after the US Open. The 1970 Houston Women's Invitation for nine women players was formed. Heldman was friends with Joseph Cullman, CEO and chairman of Phillip Morris, who secured the new tournament. The tournament was a success and the women found footing, "so, at the bidding of the Original 9, Heldman – who had secured backing from Philip Morris's Virginia Slims cigarette brand for her Houston Invitational – went back to her friend, Philip Morris chairman Joe Cullman III, to see if the company would support a circuit of some kind. Delighted by the publicity splash from Houston, Cullman was only too keen to give the women what they needed: financial backing, to the tune of a quarter of a million dollars, and the Virginia Slims name as title sponsor for a circuit in 1971."

The International Lawn Tennis Federation (ILTF) began dropping several women's competitions from the tournaments it presided over.  For example, in 1970, the ILTF sanctioned 15 men-only tournaments, all of which had previously been combined events. The Virginia Slims Circuit, which would later absorb the ILTF's Women's Grand Prix circuit, and eventually become the WTA Tour. The circuit was composed of 19 tournaments, all based in the United States (one in Puerto Rico), and prize money totalled $309,100.

In 1973 the US Open tennis tournament became the first Grand Slam tournament to award the same prize money for women as men. The Australian Open would become the second Grand Slam offering equal prize money following suit in 1985 although the tournament awarded men more money from 1996-2000 before equal prize money returned in 2001. The French Open offered equal prize money for champions in 2006. In 2007 both Wimbledon and the French Open both offered equal prize money.

The momentum that began in the 1970s blossomed into the 1980s. By solidifying television contracts to broadcast tournaments allowed tennis to come into everyone's home. You didn't need a ticket to see the spectacle of players that represented countries around the globe. The sport became increasingly more popular as coverage spread."The '80s energized the popularity base, taking tennis out of country clubs and landed estates into public parks and arenas. It became a sport, in contrast to an amenable pastime."

"From those first steps in Houston in 1970 to the current WTA Tour, with tournaments in 33 countries and total prize money of $139 million (in 2018); from a prize pot 10 times lower than the men at the Grand Slams in 1970 to parity in 2007 and ever since, women's tennis has become (almost) the equal of its male counterpart. And they did it themselves, which also explains why their governance is still independent today."

WTA Tour

The WTA was founded at a meeting organised by Billie Jean King, a week before the 1973 Wimbledon Championships. This meeting was held at Gloucester Hotel in London. In 1975, the WTA increased its financial stature by signing a television broadcast contract with CBS, the first in the WTA's history. Further financial developments ensued.  In 1976, Colgate assumed sponsorship of the circuit from April to November.  In 1979, Avon replaced Virginia Slims as the sponsor of the winter circuit, and in its first year offered the largest prize fund for a single tournament, $100,000 for the Avon Championships, in the WTA tennis history. The Colgate Series, renamed the Toyota Series in 1981, included tournaments in all parts of the world, whereas the Avon sponsored events took place solely in the US. The two circuits merged beginning with the 1983 season, when Virginia Slims returned to take full sponsorship rights of the WTA Tour. Every tournament under the administration of the WTA now became part of the Virginia Slims World Championships Series.

In all, Virginia Slims (Philip Morris) sponsored women's tennis from 1970 to 1978 and again from 1983 to 1994.  The sponsored has received such criticism as the following from the Stanford [University] Research Into the Impact of Tobacco Advertising: "Virginia Slims cleverly sponsored the WTA Tour Championships at the time to increase connections between cigarettes and healthy female athletes."

In 1977, women's tennis was the first professional sport opened to transgender women. The New York Supreme Court ruled in favour of Renée Richards, a player who underwent male-to-female sex reassignment surgery. Eligibility of transgender players is officially regulated under the current WTA official rulebook.

In April 1977, the Washington Post published an article entitled "Social Variety Is Slim On Women's Tennis Tour" which looked at some of the downside and difficulties faced by touring tennis pros, not unlike the problems of traveling musicians performing a whole series of tour dates and gigs. The article included the phrase "comradeship that falls short of camaraderie", because fellow members were also competitors who usually felt they needed to maintain a certain amount of distance. One player was quoted as saying, "But if you are not playing well, it is very hard."

In 1984, The Australian Open joined the US Open in offering women equal prize money, but temporarily did not between 1996 and 2000. After a 30-year campaign, 2007 marked the historic achievement of equal prize money at Roland Garros and Wimbledon. This meant all four major tournaments offered parity.

In 1995, the WTA Players Association merged with the Women's Tennis Council to form the WTA Tour.

Growth milestones
The WTA circuit continued to expand during these years. In 1971, King became the first female athlete to surpass $100,000 in earnings for a single year. Chris Evert became the first female athlete to win over $1,000,000 in career earnings in 1976. By 1980, over 250 women were playing professionally, and the circuit consisted of 47 global events, offering a total of $7.2 million in prize money. These increased financial opportunities allowed for groundbreaking developments not only in tennis, but across women's sports.

In 1982, Martina Navratilova became the first to win over $1,000,000 in a single year. Navratilova's single year earnings exceeded $2 million in 1984.  In 1997, Martina Hingis became the first to earn over $3 million during a single year.  In 2003, Kim Clijsters surpassed $4 million in earnings for a single year. In 2006, Venus Williams and the WTA pushed for equal prize money at both the French Open and Wimbledon.  Both of these Grand Slam events relented in 2007 and awarded equal money for the first time.  This enabled Justine Henin, who won the French Open in 2007, to earn over $5 million that year, becoming the first woman in sports to do this. In 2009, Serena Williams went over the six million mark by earning over $6.5 million in a single year. Then in 2012 both Serena Williams and Victoria Azarenka became the first players to exceed $7 million in prize money in a single season. In 2013 Serena Williams went over the twelve million dollar mark, winning $12,385,572 in a single year.

Management
American sports entrepreneur Jerry Diamond (1928–1996) served as executive director of the women's association from 1974 to 1985. He was instrumental in negotiating business deals with Avon, Colgate-Palmolive, and Toyota, and worked out the deal that made Virginia Slims the titular sponsor of the WTA tour.

Larry Scott became chairman and CEO of the WTA on 16 April 2003. While at the WTA, Scott put together the largest sponsorship in the history of women's sports, a six-year, $88 million sponsorship deal with Sony Ericsson. On 24 March 2009, Scott announced that he was resigning as WTA chief to take up a new position as the Commissioner of the Pacific-10 Conference, now the Pac-12 Conference, on 1 July 2009.

Scott pointed to Korn Ferry to headhunt his replacement but "with no decision made" on 13 July 2009, WTA Tour announced the appointment of Stacey Allaster, the Tour's president since 2006, as the new chairman and CEO of the WTA. Allaster was named as one of the "Most Powerful Women in Sports" by Forbes Magazine and led the WTA through significant growth and under her leadership, she secured a media agreement that would maximise fan exposure to women's tennis globally. During her time with the WTA, she generated an estimated $1 billion in diversified contract revenues, built the brand globally, and was a strong advocate for gender equality. She announced her retirement as chief executive of the WTA on 22 September 2015 citing a personal change in priorities.

On 5 October, Steve Simon, the Tournament Director of the BNP Paribas Open, was announced to succeed Stacey as the new WTA chairman and CEO.

WTA Tour tournaments

The current tournament structure was introduced in 2009. Premier Tournaments replaced the previous Tier I and Tier II events, and International Tournaments replaced Tier III and IV events.
 Grand Slam tournaments (4)
 Year-ending WTA Finals (1)
 Premier tournaments (20):
  Premier Mandatory: Four US$6.5 million events (increased from $4.5 million in 2013).  Each of these are combined tournaments with male professional tennis players, just like the Grand Slam tournaments, and have equal prize money for both genders.  These tournaments are held in Indian Wells, Miami, Madrid, and Beijing.
  Premier Five: Five $2.8 million events in Doha/Dubai, Rome, Montreal/Toronto, Cincinnati, and Wuhan; Of these, Rome, Montreal/Toronto and Cincinnati are combined male/female tournaments.
  Premier: Twelve events with prize money from US$799,000 to US$2.5 million. None of these are combined male/female tournaments.
 International tournaments: There are 32 tournaments, with prize money for all except four events at US$250,000. The exceptions are the Shenzhen Open, Moscow River Cup, Hong Kong Tennis Open and the Tianjin Open, each with prize money of US$750,000; and the year-ending WTA Elite Trophy in Zhuhai which has prize money of US$2.3 million.
 WTA 125k Series since 2012 (number of events varies each year; in 2018 there were ten tournaments: four in United States, two in China and one each in Croatia, France, India and Taiwan), with prize money for the four events in United States at US$150,000 and at the other events at around US$125,000.

Ranking points are also available at tournaments on the ITF Women's Circuit organised by the International Tennis Federation, which comprises several hundred tournaments each year with prize funds ranging from US$15,000 to US$100,000, and at the Olympic Games.

In 2020, the tournament naming was simplified to align with the ATP system of naming – WTA 1000, WTA 500, and WTA 250 – with at least one tournament, the Cincinnati Masters, moved up in status from the middle category to the top.

Players' Council
The Players' Council is a group or sub-committee under the WTA board of directors, consisting of eight selected players on the tour that advocate player interest, handles grievances, changes in the tennis schedule and other concerns.

2023 Players' Council
 1–20 Ranking Category: Victoria Azarenka, Madison Keys, Jessica Pegula, Sloane Stephens
 21–50 Ranking Category: Donna Vekić
 51–100 Ranking Category: Magda Linette
 21+ Ranking Category: Gabriela Dabrowski 
 101+ Ranking Category: Aleksandra Krunić

 Notes

Ranking method
The WTA rankings are based on a rolling 52-week, cumulative system. A player's ranking is determined by her results at a maximum of 16 tournaments for singles and 11 for doubles and points are awarded based on how far a player advances in a tournament. The basis for calculating a player's ranking are those tournaments that yield the highest ranking points during the rolling 52-week period. The period must include:
 the four Grand Slams
 the four WTA 1000 Mandatory tournaments
 the best of two results among the WTA 1000 Non-Mandatory tournaments
 the best of six results from the Elite Trophy, WTA 1000 tournaments, WTA 500 tournaments, WTA 250 tournaments, WTA 150 tournaments, and ITF 15s+ events
 the WTA Finals as a bonus tournament if the player attended

All WTA players also have a Universal Tennis Rating, based on head-to-head results.

The points distribution for tournaments in 2021 is shown below:

S = singles players, D = doubles teams, Q = qualification players.
* Assumes undefeated Round Robin match record.
"+H" indicates that Hospitality is provided.

WTA rankings

These lists are based on the WTA rankings.

Global Advisory Council members
The Global Advisory Council of international business leaders has sixteen members .

Darcy Antonellis, President, Technical Operations Warner Bros. Entertainment Inc.
Sir Richard Branson, chairman and founder, Virgin Group, Ltd.
Christa Carone, Chief marketing officer, Xerox Corporation
Claude de Jouvencel, member, Supervisory Council of Groupe Marnier-Lapostolle (Grand Marnier); chairman, Wine & Spirits Association of France (FEVS)
Karen Elliott House, former publisher, Wall Street Journal
Billie Jean King, co-founder, World TeamTennis; founder, WTA Tour
Bessie Lee, chief executive officer, GroupM China
Winston Lord, Chairman Emeritus, International Rescue Committee; former US Ambassador to China
Jay Lorsch, Louis E. Kirstein Professor, Human Relations, Harvard Business School
Scott Mead, President & founder partner, Richmond Park Partners
Arnon Milchan, owner & founder, Regency Enterprises
William Pfeiffer, CEO & founder, Dragongate Entertainment
Bruce Rockowitz, Group President & CEO, Li & Fung Limited
Hardwick "Wick" Simmons, former chairman, International Tennis Hall of Fame
Jan Soderstrom, Chief marketing officer, SunPower corporation
Kimberly A. Williams, chief operating officer, NFL Network, National Football League

See also

 WTA Tour
 Association of Tennis Professionals
 List of tennis tournaments
 List of WTA number 1 ranked players
 Women's sports
 WTA Awards
 WTA Challenger Series
 WTA Tour Championships
 WTA Tour records
 Tennis Integrity Unit
 WTA rankings

References

Books
King, Billie Jean, and Starr, Cynthia, We Have Come a Long Way, 1988,

External links
 Official WTA Tour website 
 Official live WTA tennis streaming site 
 Official current rankings

 
Tennis governing bodies
Women's sports governing bodies
Sports organizations established in 1973
History of tennis
1973 establishments in England
Organizations based in Florida
Tennis in Florida
Women's tennis